Nemesrádó is a village in Zala County, Hungary. It was called Rádó from 1952 until 1991 when it regained its original name. In the center of the village there's a Neo-Gothic temple.

References

External links

Populated places in Zala County